"" (He who allows dear God to rule him) is a 1641 hymn by Georg Neumark, who also composed the melody for it. It has seven verses and deals with the Christian putting their trust in God. Its author referred to it as a "Trostlied" or song of consolation and it first appeared in his  (published in Jena in 1657). It also appeared in Johann Crüger's 1672 Praxis pietatis melica and in the first part of Johann Anastasius Freylinghausen's 1704 . It has inspired musical settings, and is part of current German hymnals, both Protestant and Catholic.

Melody
Twenty other melodies have since been written for the text, though none have reached the same popularity as the original, Zahn No. 2778. The original melody has a wide usage in Protestant hymnody, including several other texts. Neumark's original is in the dorian mode, although later settings, such as by Bach, render this into G harmonic minor.

Melody in 3/2 time by Georg Neumark 1657

Version of melody in 4/4 time used by J. S. Bach

Text
Below is Neumark's original German text with the English translation of Catherine Winkworth.

Neumark's 1657 hymnbook
In his 1657 hymnbook, Neumark devoted five pages to the text, a prelude, melody and accompaniment of the hymn "".

Use in musical compositions
After it was written, the hymn tune has frequently been used by baroque composers. These include cantatas by Johann Samuel Welter and Georg Philipp Telemann as well as chorale preludes by Georg Friedrich Kauffmann, Johann Gottfried Walther and Georg Böhm. Christoph Graupner, a close colleague of Telemann, composed numerous cantatas based on the chorale, including GWV 1148/44 and GWV 1156/09.

Johann Sebastian Bach repeatedly used the hymn tune in his compositions, most notably in BWV 93, his cantata of the same name, for the fifth Sunday after Trinity, composed for 9 July 1724. Its text is based on Neumark's original, which is retained verbatim in the first and last verses and rewritten elsewhere. The same melody was set to different words in other hymns, notably "" ("Who knows how near is my end?"). Cantatas BWV 21, BWV 27, BWV 84, BWV 88, BWV 166, BWV 179 and BWV 197 use the original melody, with words taken from one or other of the texts. Cantata 21 links two stanzas with a three-part fugue (Sei nun wieder zufrieden, meine Seele); the tenor and soprano sing the cantus firmus.

BWV 642 in the Orgelbüchlein is an organ chorale prelude, with the hymn tune as its cantus firmus; whilst BWV 647 in the Schübler Chorales is an organ transcription of the fourth movement of the cantata BWV 93. In addition, two organ adaptations of the hymn are included in the Kirnberger Collection - BWV 690 (with a following figured basso-chorale) and BWV 691 (with an interesting variant and additional interludes). Another variant BWV 691a can be found in the Klavierbüchlein für Wilhelm Friedemann Bach.

After Bach and his forebears, there have been numerous arrangements of the hymn, in the eighteenth century and beyond. Organ preludes on the theme have been composed by 
Johann Peter Kellner, Johann Ludwig Krebs, Gottfried August Homilius and Johann Philipp Kirnberger. 

Amongst later generations, Felix Mendelssohn adapted the text and melody for a cantata, while Johannes Brahms used it as a theme at various points in his Deutsches Requiem. Franz Liszt arranged the melody for piano as No. 11 of his Zwölf alte deutsche geistliche Weisen, S. 504b (1878-1879). Max Reger composed three organ preludes on the hymn: Nos. 45 and 46 of his 52 Chorale Preludes, Op. 67 (1902); and No. 28 of his 30 Short Chorale Preludes, Op. 135a (1914).

Current hymnals
The hymn is No. 369 (EG 369) in the Protestant hymnal Evangelisches Gesangbuch, and No. 367 in the hymnbook of the Evangelisch-methodistische Kirche in Germany, though in the latter verse 5 is omitted.  In the German hymnbook of the Neuapostolische Kirche, stanzas 1–5 and 7 appear as number 154.

The hymn became part of the 1938 Kirchenlied. Three stanzas were included in the first edition of the Catholic hymnal Gotteslob as GL 295. The same stanzas (1, 2 and 7) are number 451 in the Swiss . In the Gotteslob of 2013, stanzas 1–3, 6 and 7 appear as GL 424.

The tune of "Wer nur den lieben Gott" has also been used for a variety of other texts.

References

Sources 
 
 Willibald Gurlitt, Hans Heinrich Eggebrecht (ed.): Riemann Musik Lexikon, Sachteil, Mainz: Schott 1967, page 456
 Hansjakob Becker and others (ed.): Geistliches Wunderhorn. Große deutsche Kirchenlieder. C. H. Beck, Munich 2001, .

External links

 Chorale Melodies used in Bach's Vocal Works / Wer nur den lieben Gott läßt walten Bach Cantatas Website 2013
 Wer nur den lieben Gott läßt walten on mutopiaproject.org

17th-century hymns in German
Lutheran hymns
1641 poems
1641 in Christianity
1641 in music